Diethyl phenylmalonate is an aromatic malonic ester used in the synthesis of moderate to long lasting barbiturates such as phenobarbital.

Chemical synthesis
Unlike other malonic esters that are derived via malonic ester synthesis, diethyl phenylmalonate is typically indirectly derived via a Claisen condensation with diethyl oxalate and ethyl phenylacetate followed by decarbonylation. This indirect method is often used because aryl halides are relatively weaker electrophiles than alkyl halides and thus poorly alkylate diethyl malonate. Methods using Caesium carbonate and copper(I) iodide have been developed to overcome this difficulty however.

References

Malonate esters
Phenyl compounds
Ethyl esters